The Electric Railways Museum of Piraeus is a railway museum in Piraeus, Athens, Greece. The museum was established in 2005 in the space of the former Post Office in Piraeus railway station. The museum displays a collection of small size items, photographs and documents related to the history of Athens-Piraeus Railway, Hellenic Electric Railways (EIS), Piraeus-Perama light railway, Piraeus Harbour tramway, Electric Transport Company (IEM) and Athens-Piraeus Electric Railways (ISAP). The museum also owns a collection of approximately 2000 small and medium size items and 3000 books, leaflets and other documents, currently in storage.

References

External links

 Museum web page
 Museum web page (Current)

Museums in Piraeus
Piraeus
Museums established in 2005
2005 establishments in Greece
Rail transport in Attica